Nerillida is an order of annelid worms in the class Polychaeta. It contains Mesonerilla prospera, a critically endangered species on the IUCN Red List.

References

External links 
 Polychaeta Higher Classification (Wayback Machine archive)

Polychaetes